The Minister for Civil Service Affairs, since 2010 called Minister for Public Administration, is a member of the Government of Sweden. The minister for civil service affairs was the head of the Ministry for Civil Service Affairs from 1840 to 1996. It was reintroduced as a minister without portfolio post in 2010. Its tasks includes government procurement and an overall responsibility for municipalities and regions.

History
The post was created when the Ministry for Civil Service Affairs was established in 1840. Through the Ministry for Civil Service Affairs, matters concerning the lantregeringen (county administrative boards) as well as rural municipalities, köpings and cities were prepared and presented. Other matters were communications (excluding road, ferry and bridge maintenance issues), in particular rail and postal services, telegraphs, telephones and other electrical installations, road, waterway and port facilities, medical and quarantine services, public health as well as civilian health care institutions, concerning the insurance and health insurance system as well as other social issues, concerning flammable oils and explosive goods and suchlike, concerning the borders of Sweden and the special status of the Laplanders, and finally in general all civil matters not assigned to another ministry. Among actual legal issues, the Ministry for Civil Service Affairs' handling included issues concerning the establishment, repeal, amendment or declaration of municipal statutes (except those relating to the church or education system) as well as legislative issues concerning insurance institutions and health insurance funds as well as compensation for occupational injuries. The cases were presented before the King by the minister for civil service affairs, who was a cabinet minister and had the title "Minister and Head of the Ministry for Civil Service Affairs", but in everyday speech was usually called the minister for civil service affairs. For the preparation and handling of cases, the minister had at his disposal an office, which in 1906 consisted of a director general for administrative affairs (expeditionschef), four directors (byråchef) (deputy directors, kansliråd), five administrative officers (kanslisekreterare), a senior registry clerk, an advisor assistant in the preparation of insurance matters and a number of extra ordinary officials.

In 1920, the Ministry for Civil Service Affairs was replaced by two ministries and hence the post of minister for civil service affairs disappeared. In 1950 the post was re-introduced when the ministry was re-established for the wage and pension system. In 1969, the ministry was completely emptied of its old contents and the minister and its ministry would instead be responsible for the county administrative boards, the municipalities and the national physical planning and then went by the name Ministry of Physical Planning and Local Government. In 1973, the post disappeared again when the ministry was renamed the Ministry of Local Government which then ceased on 31 December 1982. On 1 January 1983, the minister post was reintroduced once again as the Ministry for Civil Service Affairs came in its place as a pure ministry for issues concerning the public sector, for example for issues of working and employment conditions, co-determination and gender equality, Sweden's administrative division, rationalization and audit in central government, computer technology in public administration, statistics, public information, co-determination issues but also administrative matters concerning the Royal Court and Palace Administration (Slottsstaten). In June 1996, the Ministry for Civil Service Affairs was reorganized into the Ministry of the Interior and the post disappeared again.

In 2010, the post was reintroduced as the minister for public administration which is a minister without portfolio attached to the Ministry of Finance. Its tasks now includes government procurement and an overall responsibility for municipalities and regions.

List of officeholders

Status'''

References

Notes

Print

Civil service ministries
Lists of political office-holders in Sweden
1840 establishments in Sweden